Lepidium fremontii, the desert pepperweed, is a species of flowering plant in the mustard family which is native to the southwestern United States, where it grows on sandy desert flats and the rocky slopes of nearby hills and mountains. It takes its scientific name from John C. Frémont.

Description
Lepidium fremontii is a robust perennial herb producing a branching, tangled gray stem to about a meter in height. The many sprawling stems are foliated in linear leaves up to about 10 centimeters long which may have several fingerlike lobes. The plant produces thick racemes of many small flowers. Each flower has spoon-shaped white petals just a few millimeters long. The fruit is a mostly flattened oblong to rounded capsule under a centimeter long.

References

External links
 Jepson Manual Treatment of Lepidium fremontii
 Lepidium fremontii — U.C. Photo gallery

fremontii
Flora of Arizona
Flora of California
Flora of Nevada
Flora of Utah
Flora of the California desert regions
Flora of the Great Basin
Flora of the Sonoran Deserts
Natural history of the Colorado Desert
Natural history of the Mojave Desert
Plants described in 1871
John C. Frémont
Taxa named by Sereno Watson
Flora without expected TNC conservation status